The Cavendish River is a river of New Zealand. The river was named in 1882 by John Hay in commemoration of Lord Frederick Cavendish, who earlier that year was murdered in Dublin's Phoenix Park.

See also
List of rivers of New Zealand

References

Land Information New Zealand - Search for Place Names

Rivers of Fiordland